Tortilla Flat is a 1935 John Steinbeck novel.

Tortilla Flat may also refer to:
 Tortilla Flat (film), a 1942 American film
 Tortilla Flat, Arizona, United States, a town in the Superstition Mountains, along the Apache Trail
 Tortilla Flats, Northern Territory, Australia

See also
 Tortilla Flaps, a 1958 Looney Tunes cartoon